Chinese Taipei competed at the 2012 Asian Beach Games held in Haiyang, China from June 16 to 22, 2012. Chinese Taipei sent 40 athletes and competed in 6 sports. 

They won a total of 15 medals, including 3 golds, 6 silvers and 6 bronzes. It earned the fifth position in the general medal table.

All 3 golds were won from roller speed skating, Kao Mao-chieh in Men's 200 m time trial Chen Yan-cheng in Men's 10000 m points, and Li Meng-chu in Women's 20000 m elimination. Kou Nai-han and Chang Hui-min won the bronze medal in beach volleyball.

Medal summary

Medal by Sport

References 

Nations at the 2012 Asian Beach Games
Chinese Taipei at the Asian Beach Games
2012 in Taiwanese sport